The 2014 ADAC GT Masters season was the eighth season of the ADAC GT Masters, the grand tourer-style sports car racing founded by the German automobile club ADAC. The season started on 26 April at Motorsport Arena Oschersleben and ended on 5 October at Hockenheim after eight double-header meetings.

The drivers' championship was won by Prosperia C. Abt Racing pairing René Rast and Kelvin van der Linde, finishing 26 points of their nearest rival, Jaap van Lagen of GW IT Racing Team Schütz Motorsport. A further four points behind in third place was Callaway Competition's Daniel Keilwitz, the defending series champion. Keilwitz won the most races during the season with six victories; winning four with Andreas Wirth and two with Oliver Gavin, who split the season alongside Keilwitz. Rast and van der Linde won three races during the season, while van Lagen won two with Kévin Estre. HTP Motorsport and Pixum Team Schubert also won two races, with their respective pairings of Maximilian Buhk and Maximilian Götz, and Dominik Baumann and Claudia Hürtgen, while the other race victory was taken by the RWT , with Sven Barth and David Jahn prevailing at the Nürburgring.

The teams' championship was also won by Prosperia C. Abt Racing, with two other entries also scoring points towards the championship besides the car of Rast and van der Linde. The team finished four points clear of Callaway Competition, who had entered four cars, with Pixum Team Schubert finishing a further four points behind. Herbert Handlos was the winner of the Gentlemen Drivers' Cup, finishing 72.5 points clear of his nearest rival, Dominic Jöst.

Entry list

Race calendar and results
The eight-event calendar for the 2014 season was announced on 25 November 2013.

References

External links
 
 ADAC GT Masters on RacingSportCars
 2014 ADAC GT Masters season on Speedsport Magazine

ADAC GT Masters season
ADAC GT Masters seasons